Morteza Hannaneh (March 1, 1923 – October 17, 1989) was an Iranian composer and 
Musician

He composed for some films, such as Fleeing the Trap in 1971.

Musical career
He studied Horn at the Tehran Conservatory of Music and basic composition with Parviz Mahmoud, Hannaneh and Mahmoud  were the true founder of Tehran Symphony Orchestra. For a short period he was the principal conductor of this orchestra in 1953 to 1955s. Hannaneh also studied composition in Italy and after his return to Iran he established Farabi Orchestra in Radio Tehran in 1963s.

Hannaneh also composed soundtracks for Persian films and he was the first composer who composed music for films in Iran.

Hannaneh's most important works include "The Execrable Capriccio per pianoforte e Orchestra"; "Hezar Dastan Overture" (on a melody by Morteza Neydavoud; for symphonic orchestra); "In Memory of Ferdowsi" (for soprano and piano), the books "Lost Scales"; "The Even Harmony"; (in Persian), etc.

In addition to being an outstanding composer Morteza Hannaneh was a great teacher and mentor to many. One of his notable students is Canadian composer, conductor and strategist Joseph Lerner and Iranian musician Amir Ali Hannaneh.

See also
 Music of Iran
 List of Iranian musicians

References

External links
 گفتگو با چند موسیقیدان در مورد استاد مرتضی حنانه  (Hamshahri newsletter)

1923 births
1989 deaths
Burials at Emamzadeh Taher
Iranian composers
20th-century composers
20th-century Iranian people